Patrick Joseph O'Regan (6 February 1869 – 24 April 1947) was a Member of Parliament for Inangahua and Buller, in the South Island of New Zealand. He was later appointed to the Legislative Council.

Early life
O'Regan was born in Charleston, on the West Coast of New Zealand to Patrick O'Regan (an Irish immigrant and goldminer) and his wife Mary.

Political career

O'Regan represented Inangahua (–1896) and Buller (–1899) in the New Zealand House of Representatives. He was defeated in the  when he stood for re-election in Buller.

He was involved with the Knights of Labour and Henry George's Single Tax Movement. In 1896, O'Regan introduced the Proportional Representation Bill into Parliament: it failed to carry the second reading by only 6 votes.

A lawyer by profession, O'Regan represented striking workers in 1913 and conscientious objectors charged with sedition in World War I.

However, he did not join the Labour Party.

O'Regan was made a judge of the Court of Arbitration in 1937 and a member of the Legislative Council on 9 September 1946 and he held that position for the few months until his death in Wellington on 24 April 1947.

He was the father of surgeon and activist Rolland O'Regan.

Further reading

 The Parliamentary Record: 1840–1984 by J.O. Wilson (1985, Government Printer, Wellington)

References

|-

1869 births
1947 deaths
Independent MPs of New Zealand
Members of the New Zealand Legislative Council
New Zealand Liberal Party MPs
People from the West Coast, New Zealand
Georgist politicians
Unsuccessful candidates in the 1899 New Zealand general election
Unsuccessful candidates in the 1905 New Zealand general election
Unsuccessful candidates in the 1902 New Zealand general election
Members of the New Zealand House of Representatives
New Zealand MPs for South Island electorates
19th-century New Zealand politicians
20th-century New Zealand judges
20th-century New Zealand lawyers
19th-century New Zealand lawyers